NA-176 Kot Addu-cum-Muzaffargarh is a newly-created constituency for the National Assembly of Pakistan. It mainly consists of the town of Sanawan, along with areas of Muzaffargarh Tehsil and Kot Addu Tehsil.

Area
Muzaffargarh Tehsil
Rung Pur
Muradabad
Sanawan
Gujrat
Mehmood Kot

Election 2018 

General elections were held on 25 July 2018.

See also
NA-175 Kot Addu
NA-177 Muzaffargarh-I

References 

Muzaffargarh

Constituencies of Muzaffargarh
Politics of Muzaffargarh
Constituencies of Punjab, Pakistan
Constituencies of Pakistan